Last Seen Alive is a 2022 American action thriller film directed by Brian Goodman and written by Marc Frydman. It stars Gerard Butler, who also produced the film, Jaimie Alexander and Russell Hornsby. Formerly known as Chase, the film follows a man who takes the law into his own hands in the search for his missing wife. 

It was released in the United States on June 3, 2022 and received mixed reviews from critics. On October 1, 2022, the film was released on Netflix and instantly became Netflix's most watched film in the United States. The film also found international success on Netflix and was placed on "Top 10 Most Watched Films" lists in numerous countries.

Plot
The movie opens with a brief scene of Detective Paterson accusing Knuckles of kidnapping, and threatens him with life in prison. As the detective squeezes his throat, Knuckles finally gasps, "she's dead."   

Wealthy real-estate agent Will Spann and his wife Lisa are driving to Lisa's parents' house, where she wants some time to herself. Before reaching the house, they stop for gas and Lisa heads inside to purchase a bottle of water. As she leaves the store she's greeted by a man, but as she moves toward him a large white truck pulls up, blocking the rest of their interaction from view. Will finishes gassing up and looks for Lisa, but cannot find her in the store or bathrooms. He starts to panic, frantically searching the entire area, calling her phone, and asking if anyone's seen her. He finally calls the local police department to report her disappearance and heads to her parents' house.

Lisa's parents, Barry and Anna Adams, get into a minor argument with Will as he tries to tell them what happened and asks for their help in locating her. A flashback reveals the tension between the couple, where Lisa suggests some time apart but can't explain why she's no longer invested in their marriage. Will heads back to the gas station and meets Detective Paterson, who questions the gas station clerk, Oscar, asking for security footage, but Oscar claims the cameras are broken. The detective returns to the station but Will notices the camera's indicator lamp is lit. He queries Oscar, and after a fight retrieves the CCTV recorder, which he takes to Paterson at the station. They see the start of Lisa's interaction before the white truck blocks the view, then the people are gone, also the older model automobile around the corner. 

Detective Paterson then takes Will to the interrogation room, but the questions lead Will to believe he is suspected of arranging her disappearance due to marital problems. He leaves angrily and shows the picture of the man and his car from the security footage to Anna and Barry; they identify him as Knuckles, their handyman, and it's his car. Will breaks into Knuckles' trailer and questions him about Lisa. They get into a violent fight in which Will finally subdues Knuckles and takes his gun. Knuckles says he was forced to leave Lisa with someone named Frank. Will binds Knuckles, bundles him into his trunk, and drives off to find Frank, but gets pulled over for speeding. The cop demands Will step out of his car to search it. Will knows the cop will find Knuckles in the trunk, and flees through the woods on the side of the road. Meanwhile, Detective Paterson visits Barry and Anna, who reveal Lisa's affair with "Clint", but that she had rebuffed his attempts to renew their relationship. Another flashback indicates Anna was distrustful of Will. 

Will reaches a lower road and encounters a man who turns out to be a Frank's guard, but talks him into letting him pass. He finds Frank's camp in the woods, a derelict farm, the main building of which is an extensive but rudimentary drug lab. Most of the inhabitants are unconcerned at his presence. He sees Oscar arrive, confirming his earlier suspicions. Will sneaks around the camp in search of Lisa. A flashback reveals the moment Knuckles takes Lisa, threatening her into his car. Will stalks Frank into the building and pulls the gun, begging him to reveal where his wife is. A firefight ensues, ending up with Frank and one of his men dead. A small fire starts on the floor, not far from drug chemicals and tanks of flammable solvent. 

The opening scene with Detective Paterson and Knuckles replays, as Paterson pushes Knuckles to confess. Finally, Knuckles reveals Lisa is dead, and how he had kidnapped her as part of a ransom plot, describing how he'd been forced by Frank to "fix his mistake" and dig a hole to bury her. Will, now free to search the camp, encounters Oscar, who reveals he has Lisa's phone and that he knows where she is, demanding $20,000 for information. The building suddenly explodes, killing Oscar, and Detective Paterson arrives on-scene. He tells Will to stay and goes to investigate the hole, finding it empty. At the same time, Will hears banging from a nearby shed and finds a terrified but alive Lisa tied up. They embrace and he carries her out. 

At the Adams' house, Detective Paterson briefly stops by to inform Will that Knuckles confessed and says he knows not everyone at the drug lab died in the explosion, since gunshot wounds were found on some bodies, but was not going to investigate further. He smiles and drives off. Lisa tells Will she wants to show him something and they walk off, smiling and holding hands.

Cast
Gerard Butler as Will Spann
Jaimie Alexander as Lisa Spann
Russell Hornsby as Detective Paterson
Ethan Embry as Knuckles
Michael Irby as Oscar
Cindy Hogan as Anna Adams, Lisa's mother
Bruce Altman as Barry Adams, Lisa's father

Production and release
The film was shot under the title of Chase and was acquired for distribution by Voltage Pictures in July 2021. It was added to Netflix in the United States on October 1, 2022. Last Seen Alive became Netflix's most watched film following its release in the U.S., Philippines, Thailand, Vietnam and Hong Kong. The film placed at #2 in Singapore, Taiwan and Indonesia and #6 in India. 

On November 3, 2022, Variety reported that Last Seen Alive had 747 million minutes viewed on Netflix and the film debuted at number 6 on Nielsen Streaming Top 10 list. On the week of January 30– February 5, 2023,  Last Seen Alive placed at #1 on Netflix's list of most watched films, "Top 10 By Country" in Denmark,  #2 in Finland and Sweden, and #3 in Norway.

Reception
On Rotten Tomatoes, the film holds an approval rating of 15% based on 13 reviews, with an average rating of 3.9/10. Common Sense Media gave the film 2 stars out of 5, claiming the film failed to "manage to create a sense of intrigue about any of its characters".

References

External links

American action thriller films
American mystery thriller films
Films about missing people
2022 action thriller films
2020s English-language films
Films directed by Brian Goodman